CIO is a magazine related to technology and IT. The magazine was founded in 1987 and is now entirely digital. The name refers to the job title chief information officer.

CIO is part of Boston-based International Data Group's enterprise publications business.

Background
Founded 1987 in Framingham, Massachusetts, as a monthly magazine at a time when the CIO title was relatively new and relatively unknown in corporate America, today CIO is also noted for its CIO-100 annual awards, for those "that have distinguished themselves through the effective and innovative use" of information technology.

CIO.com
In 1996, the website was launched as a companion to the magazine.

On October 29, 2015, editor-in-chief Maryfran Johnson announced that the print magazine had ceased publication.

Industry coverage
Coverage includes
Companies that supply hardware, software and services,
Technical topics
Industry trends

References

Business magazines published in the United States
Monthly magazines published in the United States
Online magazines published in the United States
Defunct magazines published in the United States
International Data Group
Magazines established in 1987
Magazines disestablished in 2015
Magazines published in Boston
Magazines published in Massachusetts
Online magazines with defunct print editions